La Ronde may refer to:

Geography
La Ronde, Charente-Maritime, a commune in the Charente-Maritime département, France
La Ronde River, on the Caribbean island of Dominica
La Ronde (amusement park), Montreal, Quebec, Canada
A La Ronde, an 18th-century, 16-sided house located in Exmouth, Devon, England

People
Everald La Ronde (born 1963), English former footballer
La Ronde (literary society), a Haitian literary society founded by Georges Sylvain

Theatre, film and TV
La Ronde (play), Arthur Schnitzler's 1897 play also known as Reigen
La Ronde (1950 film), directed by Max Ophūls, based on the play
La Ronde (1964 film) or Circle of Love, directed by Roger Vadim, based on the play
La Ronde (2011 film), a Canadian short film directed by Sophie Goyette

Gastronomy
La Ronde (restaurant), first revolving restaurant in the United States

Music
"La Ronde", song by André Caplet

See also 
Le rondeau (dance)
Round dance
Ronde (disambiguation)